John Manners-Sutton may refer to:

John Manners-Sutton (1752–1826), MP
John Manners-Sutton (1822–1898), MP, grandson of the above
John Manners-Sutton, 3rd Viscount Canterbury (1814–1877), British politician and colonial administrator
John Manners-Sutton, 3rd Baron Manners (1852–1927)

See also
John Manners (disambiguation)
John Sutton (disambiguation)